St Andrew's Church is a Church of England parish church in Presteigne, Powys, Wales. It was first constructed in the 9th century by the Anglo-Saxons and retains elements of the original Anglo-Saxon church within a Norman renovation and later Victorian restoration. It is a Grade I listed building.

History 
In the 9th century, Anglo-Saxons built St Andrew's Church next to the River Lugg. Following the Norman conquest of Wales, when the majority of the church was damaged during an attack by the Welsh, the Normans constructed a church incorporating the Anglo-Saxon north aisle. In the 12th–13th centuries the church was enlarged and a bell tower was constructed with a new nave and south aisle constructed by canons from Wigmore Abbey.

In 1868, a restoration of the church financed by Sir Richard Green-Price and undertaken by Sir George Gilbert Scott was carried out. Inside he repaired the original roof and wooden belfry but removed the west gallery and added a new nave, chancel and sanctuary. On the exterior, he changed the design to reflect the popular Gothic Revival architecture at the time. In doing so he added a vestry, transepts and a new spire for the bell tower. A memorial to Joseph Baker, for whom Mount Baker in Washington state, United States is named, was installed in the chapel of the church as he had retired to Presteigne. A 13th-century coffin lid, possibly from a member of the Mortimer Family, is also installed in the north side of the church. It was granted Grade II*-listed status in 1985 for being "a virtually complete example of the rural work of Sir George Gilbert Scott's office; whilst the church does retain significant medieval fabric, the consistency and coherence of its restoration make it a remarkably clear statement of Ecclesiological principles."

Tapestry 
In 1737, St Andrew's Church was given a Flemish tapestry from 1510 illustrating Jesus' triumphal entry into Jerusalem. Upon receipt it was first used as an altar cloth for the church's altar up until the 19th century. In the 19th century, it was then framed and hung on the north wall of the church. It is one of only two pre-English Reformation tapestries to be hung on display in parish churches in the United Kingdom.

Referendum 
In 1914, the Welsh Church Act 1914 was passed by the Parliament of the United Kingdom to disestablish the Church in Wales from the Church of England. Owing the enactment of the disestablishment being delayed by the Suspensory Act 1914, in 1915 seventeen parishes (including Presteigne with Discoed) were balloted by the Welsh Church Commissioners in a referendum as to whether they wanted to remain part of the Church of England or join the Church in Wales. These parishes were given the choice because their parish boundaries crossed the geographical borders between England and Wales. St Andrew's parishioners voted 595–289 to remain part of the Church of England despite the church being located in Wales. As a result of the decision in the referendum, St Andrew's Church remained a part of the Diocese of Hereford.

References 

Presteigne
Church of England church buildings in Wales
George Gilbert Scott buildings
Presteigne